Catherine Lutes is a Canadian cinematographer. She is most noted for her work on the film Disappearance at Clifton Hill, for which she received a Canadian Screen Award nomination for Best Cinematography at the 8th Canadian Screen Awards in 2020.

Her other credits have included the films The Armoire (2009), Molly Maxwell (2013), The People Garden (2016), Pyotr495 (2016), Mouthpiece (2018) and Firecrackers (2018), and episodes of the television series Hotbox, Picnicface, Baroness von Sketch Show, You Me Her and Anne with an E.

References

External links

Canadian cinematographers
Canadian women cinematographers
Living people
Year of birth missing (living people)